The Vayalur Murugan Temple  is a Hindu temple dedicated to Muruga, son of Lord Shiva and Parvati, located in the village of Kumaravayalur in Tiruchirapalli district, Tamil Nadu, India. The temple is believed to have been initiated during the period of Medieval Cholas during the 9th century. The temple is maintained and administered by the Hindu Religious and Charitable Endowments Department of the Government of Tamil Nadu. Though the presiding deity is Shiva, the temple is known for the Murugan shrine. The temple is associated with Hindu savant, Kirupanandha Variyar.

The temple
This temple is around 1200 years old and was built during the reign of Cholas. The temple was built by the Cholas in the 9th century AD. The temple is surrounded by lush green fields and located close to the Uyyakondan river. The gopuram of the temple was connected by the Hindu savant, Kirupanandha Variyar. The main deity in the temple is Muruga, it is behind the Moolavar Shiva Sannithy. The other Sannithys in this temple are Moolavar arulmigu Athi Nathar (Lord Shiva).  Agni Theertham also known as Shakthi Theertham. According to a legend, Lord Muruga himself created this tank with his Velayudham. Sthala Vriksham: Vanni Maram (Vanni tree) is seen in the left side from the entrance of rajagopuram. The five-tiered rajagopuram is a modern addition. The presiding deity Shiva is represented in the form of Adinathar and his consort Adinayagi. The image of Muthukumaraswawmy is located in the first precinct behind the sanctum.

Festivals

The temple priests perform the puja (rituals) during festivals and on a daily basis. The temple rituals are performed six times a day; Kalasanthi at 6:00 a.m., Muthalam Kalam at 8:00 a.m., Uchikalam at 12:00 a.m., Sayarakshai at 6:00 p.m, Rendam Kalam at 8:00 p.m. and Arthajamam at 9:00 p.m.. Each ritual comprises four steps: abhisheka (sacred bath), alangaram (decoration), naivethanam (food offering) and deepa aradanai (waving of lamps) for Kachabeswarar and Anjanatchi. The eleven-day Vaikasi Visakam during the Tamil month of Vaikasi (May - June), Thai Poosam during the Tamil month of Thai (January - February), Panguni Uthiram during the month of Mar - Apr, Vaikasi Visakam , the birth star of Murugan during the month of May - June, Adi Kirthikai during the month of July/August, Thiru Karthikai during the month of oct/nov and Kanda shasti  November are the most prominent festivals in the temple. The temple is a very prominent temples dedicated to Murugan.

Literary mention
Arunagirinathar was a 15th-century Tamil poet born in Tiruvannamalai. He spent his early years as a rioter and seducer of women. After ruining his health, he tried to commit suicide by throwing himself from the northern tower of Annamalaiyar Temple, but was saved by the grace of god Murugan. He became a staunch devotee and composed Tamil hymns glorifying Murugan, the most notable being Thirupugazh. Arunagirinathar visited various Murugan temples and on his way back to Tiruvannamalai, visited Vayalur and sung praises about Murugan.

Notes

References

External links
Temple's home page
http://www.murugan.org/temples/vayalur.htm
Templenet article

Hindu temples in Tiruchirappalli district
Murugan temples in Tamil Nadu